Independence Day of Grenada is a public holiday on :7 February. It is celebrated with parades and ceremonies  to commemorate Grenada's Independence from the United Kingdom in 1974. The 45th anniversary was in 2019.

References 

Public holidays in Grenada
Grenada
February observances